Kestutis John "Ken" Bungarda (born January 25, 1957) is a former American football tackle who played college football for Missouri (1975–1978) and professional football in the Canadian Football League (CFL) for the Toronto Argonauts (1979) and in the National Football League (NFL) for the San Francisco 49ers (1980).

Early years
Bungarda was born in 1957 in Hartford, Connecticut, and attended Livingston High School in Berkeley Heights, New Jersey. He played college football for the Missouri Tigers from 1975 to 1978. He played as a defensive end , (10 tfl and 44 tackles in 1978), at Missouri and received the nickname "Tarzan". Missouri defeated Notre Dame ,3-0  the  defending National Champions at South Bend,Ind. the first game of the season 1978, at Nebraska ranked #2 for the last game of the 1978 season at Lincoln,Neb. Finishing the year with Liberty Bowl win vs LSU.

Professional football
He was drafted by the Cincinnati Bengals in the 11th round (278th overall pick) of the 1979 NFL Draft. He instead signed with the Toronto Argonauts of the CFL, appearing in four games during the 1979 season. In 1980, he signed with the San Francisco 49ers and appeared in 15 games. He suffered a knee injury during the 1981 season as the Starting left Offensive Tackle for the San Francisco 49ers, 1981, SAN FRANCISCO 49ERS WON SUPER BOWL XVI that year 1981, has a Super Bowl Championship Ring XVI, San Francisco 49ers,.. next two years spent on the 49ers Injured Reserve, IR.

References

1957 births
Living people
American football tackles
Toronto Argonauts players
San Francisco 49ers players
Missouri Tigers football players
Players of American football from Hartford, Connecticut